The 1959 NCAA Soccer Tournament was the inaugural men's college soccer tournament organized by the NCAA to determine the top men's collegiate soccer team in the United States.

The inaugural championship was played on November 28, 1959 at Memorial Stadium at the University of Connecticut in Storrs.

Saint Louis defeated Bridgeport in the final, 2–0, to claim the inaugural title.

Teams

Bracket

See also 
 1959 Saint Louis Billikens men's soccer team

References 

1959 NCAA soccer season
NCAA Division I Men's Soccer Tournament seasons
NCAA
NCAA
NCAA Soccer Tournament
NCAA Soccer Tournament